Islamic Reconciliation Party or Al-Wefaq Islamic Party formerly named Reconciliation Committee (Lejnat Al-Wefaq), was an Iranian local ethnic party associated with Arab minority in Khuzestan Province.

The party had candidates shared with the Islamic Iran Participation Front, and was described as its Arabic wing. It won several seats in Ahvaz's City Council, as well as a seat in the Iranian Parliament.

Dissolution 
On 4 November 2006, the Judicial system of Iran banned the party and declared it illegal on charges of "instigating unrest" and "opposing the system", accusing it of fueling 2005 Ahvaz unrest. Following detention of some party members, a faction were radicalized and joined the Arab Struggle Movement for the Liberation of Ahwaz which is a separatist militant organization designated as a "terrorist organization" by Iran.

Election results

See also 
 Politics of Khuzestan Province
 Arab separatism in Khuzestan

References 

Political parties of minorities
Arab nationalism in Iran
Arab political parties in Iran
Banned political parties in Iran
Reformist political groups in Iran
Ahwazi Arabs
1999 establishments in Iran
2006 disestablishments in Iran
Political parties established in 1999
Political parties disestablished in 2006
Arab nationalist political parties
Defunct political parties of the Islamic Republic of Iran